Peter Franz (born 25 April 1971) is a male former international table tennis player from Germany. He competed at the 1996 Summer Olympics and the 2000 Summer Olympics.

He won a bronze medal at the 1993 World Table Tennis Championships in the Swaythling Cup (men's team event) with Steffen Fetzner, Richard Prause, Oliver Alke and Jörg Roßkopf for Germany.

See also
 List of table tennis players
 List of World Table Tennis Championships medalists

References

1971 births
Living people
German male table tennis players
World Table Tennis Championships medalists
Olympic table tennis players of Germany
Table tennis players at the 1996 Summer Olympics
Table tennis players at the 2000 Summer Olympics